American patriotic music is a part of the culture and history of the United States since its founding in the 18th century and has served to encourage feelings of honor for the country's forefathers and for national unity. These songs include hymns, military themes, national songs, and music from stage and screen, as well as songs adapted from poems. Much of American patriotic music owes its origins to six main wars—the American Revolution, the American Indian Wars, the War of 1812, the Mexican–American War, the American Civil War, and the Spanish–American War. During the period prior to American independence, much of America's patriotic music was aligned with the political ambitions of the British in the new land and so several songs are tied with the country's British origin.

Colonial era
"The Liberty Song", written by Founding Father John Dickinson in 1768 to the music of William Boyce's "Heart of Oak", is perhaps the first patriotic song written in America. The song contains the line "by uniting we stand, by dividing we fall", which was an overture to the feelings of common blood and origin the Americans had whilst fighting the French and Indian War, and is also the first recorded use of the sentiment. Additionally, other songs gained prominence in keeping with British and American unity namely "The British Grenadiers," and "God Save the King". However, with the War of Independence the tunes of the last two were combined with new words while "Yankee Doodle", long a tune and lyric addressed to the unique American population descended from the British became widely popular. Political and cultural links between the colony and Great Britain can perhaps explain the ongoing popularity of the two former tunes, despite the war for independence. Hail Columbia was written for Washington's nomination and was the de facto national anthem until 1931. It is still the vice presidential anthem today.

Nineteenth century
In 1814, Washington lawyer Francis Scott Key wrote a poem, "Defence of Fort McHenry," after witnessing the bombardment of Fort McHenry in the Chesapeake Bay during the War of 1812. Once again, owing to the origin of America from British nationals, the lyrics were later set to music common to British and American sailors, but eventually became world-famous as "The Star-Spangled Banner," and was designated the United States' official national anthem in 1931.

After centuries of struggling and fighting hostile Native Americans, diseases, and nature, Americans had breached the Appalachian mountain chain and pushed into the wide open areas of the far west. Thus, songs such as "My Country, 'Tis of Thee," composed in 1831, have as themes natural wonder combined with freedom and liberty. Others, such as "America the Beautiful," express appreciation for the natural beauty of the United States and the hope for a better nation, wrote one hymn editor. However, in contrast to "My Country, 'Tis of Thee" and the "Star Spangled Banner", "America the Beautiful" does not have the triumphalism found in many patriotic American songs. It was originally a poem composed by Katharine Lee Bates after she had experienced the view from Pikes Peak of fertile ground as far as the eye could see, and was sung to a variety of tunes until the present one, written as a hymn tune in 1882 by Samuel Ward, became associated with it.

In 1843, the song Columbia, the Gem of the Ocean was written and was most popular during the civil war. The song mostly praises the army and navy in a rousing manner. It later was commonly used in Popeye Cartoons and in the 21st century the melody is occasionally used and the lyrics rarely.

During the events leading up to the American Civil War, both the North and the South generated a number of songs to stir up patriotic sentiments such as "Battle Hymn of the Republic", and "Dixie". However, after the Civil War, the sentiments of most patriotic songs were geared to rebuilding and consolidating the United States. During the Spanish–American War in the 1890s, songwriters continued to write patriotic tunes that honored America's soldiers and rallied citizens in support of the war. Songs such as "Brave Dewey and His Men" and "The Charge of the Roosevelt Riders" lauded Commodore George Dewey and Theodore Roosevelt. Around this time, John Philip Sousa began composing many of his famous patriotic marches, including "The Stars and Stripes Forever" and "The Washington Post March." Songs such as "The Black KPs", likely labelled racist and offensive by modern listeners, were intended to rally the public behind the war effort.

Twentieth and twenty-first centuries
World War I produced patriotic American songs such as "Over There" by popular songwriter George M. Cohan. Cohan composed the song April 6, 1917, when he saw headlines announcing the U.S. had entered World War I. Cohan also is famous for penning "Yankee Doodle Dandy," an over-the-top parody of patriotic music. A 1918 Irving Berlin composition, "God Bless America", is sometimes considered an unofficial national anthem of the United States and is often performed at sporting events alongside (or, in some rare cases, such as Ronan Tynan, in place of) "The Star-Spangled Banner." In 1940, Woody Guthrie wrote "This Land Is Your Land" in response to his dislike of "God Bless America", calling it unrealistic and complacent. The World War II era produced a significant number of patriotic songs in the Big Band and Swing format. Popular patriotic songs of the time included "Remember Pearl Harbor" and "God Bless America". Patriotic songs in the later half of the 20th century included "Ballad of the Green Berets" during the Vietnam War, Lee Greenwood's "God Bless the USA" during the years of the first Gulf War and again after the September 11, 2001 attacks.

See also
 Anthems and nationalistic songs of Canada
 List of anthems of non-sovereign countries, regions and territories
 List of historical national anthems
 National Anthem Project

References

External links
 Patriotic songs, National Institute of Environmental Health Sciences website
 Early American Songs of Protest and Patriotism
 Patriotism and Nationalism in Music Education (Ashgate press, 2012)

Patriotic
18th-century music genres
19th-century music genres
20th-century music genres
21st-century music genres
American patriotic songs